Copper(I) acetylide, or cuprous acetylide, is a chemical compound with the formula Cu2C2.  Although never characterized by X-ray crystallography, the material has been claimed at least since 1856. One form is claimed to be a monohydrate with formula ..  It is a reddish solid, that easily explodes when dry.

Synthesis 
Materials purported to be copper acetylide can be prepared by treating acetylene with a solution of copper(I) chloride and ammonia:
C2H2 (g) + 2 CuCl (s) → Cu2C2 (s) + 2 HCl (g)
This reaction produces a reddish solid precipitate.

Properties 
When dry, copper acetylide is a heat and shock sensitive high explosive, more thermally sensitive than silver acetylide.

Copper acetylide is thought to form inside pipes made of copper or an alloy with high copper content, which may result in violent explosion. This was found to be the cause of explosions in acetylene plants, and led to abandonment of copper as a construction material in such plants. Copper catalysts used in petrochemistry can also possess a degree of risk under certain conditions.

Reactions 
Copper acetylide is the substrate of Glaser coupling for the formation of polyynes. The latter has been claimed to consist of carbyne, an elusive allotrope of carbon:<ref name=cataldo2>Franco Cataldo (1999), ' 'A study on the structure and electrical properties of the fourth carbon allotrope: carbyne. Polymer International, volume 44, issue 2, pages 191–200. 
</ref>
   −C(≡C−C≡)nC− 
This interpretation has been disputed.

Freshly prepared copper acetylide reacts with hydrochloric acid to form acetylene and copper(I) chloride.  Samples that have been aged with exposure to air or to copper(II) ions liberate also higher polyynes H(−C≡C−)nH, with n'' from 2 to 6, when decomposed by hydrochloric acid. A "carbonaceous" residue of this decomposition also has the spectral signature of (−C≡C−)n chains.  It has been conjectured that oxidation causes polymerization of the acetylide anions  in the solid into carbyne-type anions .C(≡C−C≡)nC2− or polycumulene-type anions C(=C=C=)mC4−.

Thermal decomposition of copper acetylide in vacuum is not explosive and leaves copper as a fine powder at the bottom of the flask, while depositing a fluffy very fine carbon powder on the walls. On the basis of spectral data, this powder was claimed to be carbyne C(−C≡C−)nC rather than graphite as expected.

Applications
Though not practically useful as an explosive due to high sensitivity and reactivity towards water, it is interesting as a curiosity because it is one of the very few explosives that do not liberate any gaseous products upon detonation.

The formation of copper acetylide when a gas is passed through a solution of copper(I) chloride is used as a test for the presence of acetylene.

Reactions between Cu+ and alkynes occur only if a terminal hydrogen is present (as it is slightly acidic in nature). Thus, this reaction is used for identification of terminal alkynes.

See also 
 Carbide
 Walter Reppe
 Ethynylation

References 

Copper(I) compounds
Acetylides
Explosive chemicals